is the ninth single by Japanese singer/songwriter Chisato Moritaka. The lyrics were written by Moritaka and the music was composed by Shinji Yasuda. The single was released alongside  by Warner Pioneer on January 25, 1990. "Michi" was used in a Glico Pocky commercial featuring Moritaka, while "Seishun" was used in the NTV drama series .

Music video 
Two music videos were made for "Michi". The first one is solely a close-up shot of Moritaka. The second video, titled  features Moritaka dressed as a western style princess aboard a ship manned by Arabian-like sailors. Both videos were released in the 1991 video album Kusai Mono ni wa Futa wo Shiro!!; the contents of the original LD release were compiled in the 2000 DVD Chisato Moritaka DVD Collection No. 6: Kusai Mono ni wa Futa wo Shiro!!/Rock Alive.

Chart performance 
"Michi"/"Seishun" peaked at No. 5 on Oricon's singles chart and sold 164,000 copies.

Other versions 
A remix of "Seishun" is included in the 1991 remix album The Moritaka.

Moritaka re-recorded "Michi" and uploaded the video on her YouTube channel on December 1, 2013. This version is also included in Moritaka's 2014 self-covers DVD album Love Vol. 6.

Track listing 
All lyrics are written by Chisato Moritaka; all music is arranged by Hideo Saitō.

Personnel 
 Chisato Moritaka – vocals
 Hideo Saitō – all instruments, programming, backing vocals

Chart positions

Cover versions 
 Sakura Tange covered the song as the B-side of her 1998 single "Free".

References

External links 
 
 
 

1990 singles
1990 songs
Japanese-language songs
Chisato Moritaka songs
Songs with lyrics by Chisato Moritaka
Warner Music Japan singles